Glee is the debut studio album by Canadian music collective Bran Van 3000. The Canadian version was released on April 15, 1997 through the Audiogram label, while the international version, slightly altered from the original, was released on March 17, 1998 through Capitol Records. The album contains the hit single "Drinking in L.A." and features hip hop supergroup Gravediggaz on "Afrodiziak".

Glee was certified gold for sales of 50,000 copies by the Canadian Recording Industry Association on February 24, 1998. The album also won the Juno Award for Alternative Album of the Year at the 1998 Juno Awards.

Track listings

References

1997 debut albums
Bran Van 3000 albums
Juno Award for Alternative Album of the Year albums
Audiogram (label) albums